John Apparao 40 Plus is a 2008 Indian Telugu film starring Krishna Bhagavan, Simran and Ruthika. The film is produced and directed by Kuchipudi Venkat under the Black and Eight banner. Comedian Krishna Bhagavan plays the lead role in this film. The film released on 20 March 2008 throughout the world with seventy prints.

Plot
Appa Rao (Krishna Bhagavan) is a career-oriented fashion designer who is in his 40s. He is still a bachelor due to lack of opportunities and career orientation. That is when a posh lady, Pravallika (Simran), approaches him and makes him fall in love with her. She offers him a new career and great business in the UK. Meantime, it is revealed that there is a dreaded ISI agent called John Alias Mastan (Krishna Bhagavan) who looks just like Appa Rao. The rest of the story is all about what happens to Appa Rao when his look-alike John spots him.

Cast

 Krishna Bhagavan as John and Appa Rao
 Simran as Pravallika
Ruthika
 Sayaji Shinde
 Shankar Melkote as Tarun Manikyal Rao
 Jeeva
 Venu Madhav
 Banerjee
 Ali
 Kondavalasa
 Gautam Raju
 Jaya Prakash Reddy
 Raghu Babu
 Satyam Rajesh
 Maruthi
 Prabhakar
 Ravikanth 
 Gundu Sudarshan
 Sivannarayana Naripeddi
 Kinnera

Production 
The film is directed by Kuchipudi Venkat, who previously directed Modati Cinema (2005) with Krishna Bhagawan (in his lead debut) and Simran in the lead roles. A song was shot in Bali. Rutika was cast as the second lead. The film was shot in 2007.

Soundtrack
This film contains six songs, all remixes. The music director was Kiran Varanasi. The soundtrack was launched on 2 February 2008.

Release
The film was scheduled to release on Sankranti in 2008. A critic from Sify gave a negative review and opined that "Director Venkat has no grip on the screenplay and his directorial skills prove he is inexperienced. Remix songs by old hits are good. On the whole, the film fails to impress". Y. Sunitha Chowdhary of The Hindu wrote that "The comedian who is known for his poker faced and spooky one liners comes across as a versatile actor here, never once overacts but unfortunately the double meaning dialogues and sexual innuendos make the film unfit for family viewing".

References

External links

2008 films
2000s Telugu-language films